William Mason Turner (born October 17, 1991) is an American football offensive tackle for the National Football League (NFL). He was drafted by the Miami Dolphins in the third round of the 2014 NFL Draft. He played college football at North Dakota State.

High school career
Turner attended Mounds View High School in Arden Hills, Minnesota. He was an all-state lineman for the Mustangs football team, helping compile a 26–8 record, winning section titles, and advancing to state playoffs all three years during his career.

College career
Turner attended North Dakota State University from 2010 to 2013. In 2010, Turner started in 12 games. In 2011, he started 14 games. In 2012, Turner started in 15 games and was named to the all-Missouri Valley Football Conference first-team. In 2013, he made all 15 starts at left tackle and was responsible for zero quarterback sacks. He was named All-Missouri Valley Football Conference first-team and two-time Offensive Lineman of the Week. He was a consensus FCS All-American in 2012 and 2013 and was part of three FCS national championship teams. He participated in the 2014 Senior Bowl. He was one of the top small-school prospects of the 2014 NFL Draft.

Professional career

2014 NFL Draft
Projected as a second-to-third round selection by CBS Sports, Turner was the highest selected North Dakota State player since Lamar Gordon in 2002. He was drafted in the third round (67th overall) by the Miami Dolphins.

Miami Dolphins
On October 9, 2016, Turner was forced into the starting lineup with starting left tackle, Branden Albert, out with an illness and backup left tackle, Laremy Tunsil, out with an injured ankle. After giving up 3 sacks and 2 quarterback pressures to the Tennessee Titans, Turner, along with Dallas Thomas, was released by the Dolphins.

Baltimore Ravens
On October 12, 2016, Turner was claimed off waivers by the Baltimore Ravens, but was released three days later.

Denver Broncos
On October 17, 2016, Turner was claimed off waivers by the Denver Broncos.

On October 17, 2017, Turner was placed on injured reserve after suffering a broken hand in Week 6 against the New York Giants.

On March 17, 2018, Turner re-signed with the Broncos. He started 11 games, four at right tackle in place of an injured Jared Veldheer, and the final seven games of the year at left guard in place of an injured Max Garcia.

Green Bay Packers

On March 14, 2019, Turner signed a four-year, $28 million contract with the Green Bay Packers. Turner started the first thirteen games of the 2021 season at right tackle before sustaining a knee injury during the Packers' week 14 game against the Chicago Bears and missing the rest of the regular season. Dennis Kelly started at right tackle for the remainder of the regular season. The Packers finished the season with the No. 1 seed in the NFC with a 13–4 record. Upon his return from injury, he started at left tackle during the Packers' divisional round playoff loss to the San Francisco 49ers in place of the injured David Bakhtiari, while Kelly started at right tackle.

On March 14, 2022, the Packers released Turner.

Denver Broncos (second stint)
On March 28, 2022, Turner signed with the Denver Broncos. He was placed on injured reserve on November 15, 2022. He was activated on December 17.

Personal life
Turner's father, Maurice Turner, and his brother, Bryan Kehl, both played in the NFL.

References

External links
Denver Broncos bio
North Dakota State bio

1991 births
Living people
People from Shoreview, Minnesota
Players of American football from Minnesota
Sportspeople from the Minneapolis–Saint Paul metropolitan area
American football offensive tackles
North Dakota State Bison football players
Miami Dolphins players
Baltimore Ravens players
Denver Broncos players
Green Bay Packers players
Ed Block Courage Award recipients